San Po Kong is an area in New Kowloon in Hong Kong. It is largely industrial and partly residential. Administratively, it belongs to Wong Tai Sin District.

Location
San Po Kong is located south of Wong Tai Sin and Diamond Hill, north of the former Kai Tak International Airport and west of Ngau Chai Wan. The area is bounded by Choi Hung Road and Prince Edward Road East.

History

Village
San Po Kong was a new village replacing the old Po Kong Village that was destroyed by the Japanese in 1943. The original village consisted of terraced housing and a small forested area along a hill. The hill was partially levelled by the Japanese during the extension of the runway at Kai Tak during World War II. Today the old village hill is now site of the Choi Hung Road Playground. Reminders of the old village lives on with street names and a park (Po Kong Village Road, Po Kong Village Road Park). The current San Po Kong is a post-War residential scheme with mostly public housing blocks.

Airport
In 1916, the area south of present-day San Po Kong was reclaimed by Ho Kai and Au Tak for a garden estate. The reclamation was completed in two phases in 1920 and 1927. The reclaimed area became known as Kai Tak Bund. The company lacked the capital to complete the project and left part the land unused. The Hong Kong Government decided to buy back the land for the Royal Air Force and a future Kai Tak Aerodrome. In the late 1930s, the airport was significantly expanded to take up the whole of San Po Kong. Clear Water Bay Road, part of the current Choi Hung Road, and a nullah were constructed around the airport. During the Japanese occupation of Hong Kong, more than 20 villages surrounding San Po Kong were demolished for further expansion of the airport.

Industrial area

In 1958, the airport was shifted south, out of San Po Kong and into Kowloon Bay. Prince Edward Road East was completed at around this time. San Po Kong became an industrial area, in many high-rise buildings. The government also established the San Po Kong Factory Estate, a factory estate for small manufacturing businesses in the early 1960s.

In May 1967, a labour dispute in a factory making artificial flowers ignited the 1967 riots, which lasted until October. During that period, public bus services were suspended, forcing workers from other areas to commute on foot.

In the 1980s, many of the manufacturing businesses in San Po Kong relocated to China, and the industrial buildings were turned into offices and godowns.

Features
Facilities in San Po Kong include:
 Mikiki, a shopping mall
 Choi Hung Road Playground
 Rhythm Garden, a housing estate
 Ho Lap College
 Ng Wah Catholic Secondary School

Transport
San Po Kong is served by Wong Tai Sin station, Diamond Hill station and Kai Tak station of the MTR.

Education
San Po Kong is in Primary One Admission (POA) School Net 43. Within the school net are multiple aided schools (operated independently but funded with government money) and Wong Tai Sin Government Primary School.

See also
 Kai Tak Development
 Po Kong Village Road Park

References

External links

 Working Paper No. 33. Regeneration of Industrial Areas in Metro Area - A Hypothetical Case Study at San Po Kong, Planning Department, November 2003
 

 
Areas of Hong Kong
Chuk Yuen
Wong Tai Sin District